Mariah Parker (born 1991), also known by the stage name Linqua Franqa, is an American rapper and community organizer. Based in Athens, Georgia, they served as the District 2 County Commissioner for Athens-Clarke County from 2018 to 2022.

Early life
Parker was raised in a small town near Louisville, Kentucky. Parker first became interested in music from listening to their mother, a gospel singer, singing alongside other family members.

After completing their undergraduate education at Warren Wilson College, Parker briefly worked as an English teacher in Brazil before moving to Athens, Georgia in 2013 or 2014.

Music career
After moving to Athens, Parker found the local hip hop community to be disorganized. In response, they founded Hot Corner Hip Hop, a project to organize shows for local hip hop acts. During this period, Parker adopted the stage name "Linqua Franqa", a pun on the term lingua franca. Parker also began writing their own raps and participating in rap battles. This early work culminated in the release of Parker's debut album, Model Minority. Parker's single "Wurk" has attracted attention among organized labor advocates and led Parker to be invited to perform at the 2022 AFL–CIO Convention.

Parker also holds a Ph.D. in Language and Literacy from the University of Georgia. Their 2022 album, Bellringer, served as their dissertation for this program. Parker describes their academic experience in linguistics as an "analytic toolkit" that helps them refine their songwriting approach and delivery.

Parker's music has been described as combining hip hop and neo-soul.

In addition to their music, Parker hosts a podcast titled "Waiting on Reparations" on iHeartRadio, alongside fellow Georgia rapper Dope Knife.

Political career
After their political lyrics attracted positive attention from the community, Parker began to become involved in community organizing. From there, they served as the campaign manager for a local activist who ran for county office.

At the urging of Athens mayor Kelly Girtz, Parker ran for office personally in 2018, campaigning for the Athens-Clarke County District 2 Commissioner seat. Parker was elected to the seat, and attracted widespread attention after being sworn in on a copy of The Autobiography of Malcolm X. They were reelected in 2020, in an unopposed election. During their tenure as commissioner, Parker prioritized racial justice and the reduction of poverty in their district. Parker was also a leading advocate of the 2021 Linnentown Resolution, an effort to make reparations to families who had been displaced in the Linnentown urban renewal project in the 1960s.

Parker announced their resignation from the county commission in August 2022, stating that they had become disillusioned with the commission's limited scope and sought to return to external activism. After their resignation took effect on September 8, Parker took up an organizer position with the workers' rights organization Raise Up the South.

Personal life
Parker is nonbinary and describes themselves as queer.

Discography
Model Minority (2017)
Bellringer (2022)

Notes

References

1991 births
Rappers from Georgia (U.S. state)
LGBT rappers
Non-binary musicians
County commissioners in Georgia (U.S. state)
Living people